Tebogo Tlolane (born 21 December 1994) is a South African soccer player who plays as a left-back or left midfielder for South African Premier Division side Orlando Pirates.

Club career
Born in Johannesburg, Tlolane started his career at Jomo Cosmos but was released by the club in 2018, and went on to join Chippa United. In the summer of 2019, he signed for Orlando Pirates, and made his debut for the club on 20 August 2019 in a 0–0 draw with AmaZulu. In January 2020, Tlolane joined Maritzburg United on loan until the end of the season. In June 2020, the deal was extended for one further season. However, he was recalled in September 2020. In October 2020, he returned to Maritzburg United on a season-long loan.

References

Living people
1994 births
South African soccer players
Soccer players from Johannesburg
Association football fullbacks
Jomo Cosmos F.C. players
Chippa United F.C. players
Orlando Pirates F.C. players
Maritzburg United F.C. players
South African Premier Division players
National First Division players